The Mounts Iglit–Baco National Park is a protected area of the Philippines and an ASEAN Heritage Park located in the island of Mindoro in central Philippines. The park covers an area of  surrounding Mount Iglit and Mount Baco in the central interior of Mindoro. It was established in 1970 by virtue of Republic Act No. 6148. In 2003, the Association of Southeast Asian Nations listed it as one of its four heritage parks in the Philippines. The park has also been nominated in the Tentative List of UNESCO World Heritage Sites.

Geography

The national park lies in the south-central area of Mindoro and is politically divided between the municipalities of Sablayan, Calintaan, Rizal and San Jose in Occidental Mindoro, and the municipalities of Bongabong and Mansalay in Oriental Mindoro. It has a rugged terrain composed of slopes, river gorges, mountains and plateaus. Mount Iglit reaches  and can be found south of Mount Baco. The park is crossed by eight major river systems, including the Lamintao and Anahawin Rivers which empty into the South China Sea. It is home to four ethnic groups on the island: the Batangas Tagalog, Mangyan, Hanunu'o and Bangan. The Mangyans depend on the park for their subsistence, where they engage in traditional farming and hunting for food. There are also areas of grasslands turned into pastures, as well as areas of slash-and-burn agriculture.

The park's vegetation consists primarily of grasslands, lowland Dipterocarp forests, and montane rainforests on the higher slopes. In the park's southern portion near the Lamintao River is a  block of Acacia forest. There is also an area of Agoho forest along the Anahawin River within the Tamaraw Gene Pool Farm ecotourism site. The rest of the lowland portions are open grasslands. The most extensive forests in the national park are in the remote northern portion in the area of Mount Baco.

The tamaraw

The park is the habitat of the endemic tamaraw (Bubalus mindorensis), a small, hoofed mammal of the bovid family unique to the Philippines. It is one of the most seriously endangered animals in the world.

The biggest population of tamaraw can be found in the open grasslands of the national park. It contains the Tamaraw Gene Pool Farm, an off-site breeding facility established in 1980 under the Tamaraw Conservation Program in Manoot, Rizal. In April 2018, 523 tamaraws were spotted in the protected area. This is up from 327 spotted in 2012.

Other flora and fauna

Apart from the tamaraw, other forms of wildlife are also found within the park including the Mindoro climbing rat, Mindoro stripe-faced fruit bat, 
Philippine deer, and wild pigs. A number of bird species also inhabit the park like the Mindoro imperial pigeon, Mindoro scops owl, black-hooded coucal, scarlet-collared flowerpecker and heart pigeon.

Some of the important indigenous plants found in the park are the kalantas tree, tindalo, almaciga, kamagong and jade vine.

See also
List of national parks of the Philippines
List of World Heritage Sites in the Philippines

References

National parks of the Philippines
ASEAN heritage parks
Protected areas established in 1970
1970 establishments in the Philippines
Geography of Occidental Mindoro
Geography of Oriental Mindoro
Tourist attractions in Occidental Mindoro
Tourist attractions in Oriental Mindoro
World Heritage Tentative List for the Philippines